Kavaludaari is a 2019 Indian Kannada-language neo-noir thriller film written and directed by Hemanth Rao, presented by Puneeth Rajkumar and produced by Ashwini Puneeth Rajkumar of PRK Productions. Kavaludaari will be the first feature film presentation from the production house. The film stars Rishi, Anant Nag, Achyuth Kumar, Suman Ranganath, and Roshni Prakash in the lead roles, while Avinash, Sulile Kumar, Sampath, and Sidhaartha Maadhyamika play supporting roles. The music and background score for the film is composed by Charan Raj with cinematography by Advaitha Gurumoorthy and editing by Jagadeesh. The film released on 12 April 2019.

Puneeth Rajkumar had revealed that the movie is being remade in Tamil, Telugu, Malayalam and Hindi. The film was remade in Tamil as Kabadadaari starring Sibiraj and in Telugu as Kapatadhaari starring Sumanth; both versions star Nandita Swetha.

Plot
K.S Shyam is a sincere traffic cop, whose real interest lies in handling crime-related cases. One day, he accidentally comes across the skeletal remains of a three-member family, and he decides to pursue his interest despite warning from his senior officer. However, his plans hit roadblock when he gets to know that the remains are four-decades old. The forensic reports show that there are signs of struggle on the bodies, so it most likely was a murder. His encounter with Kumar, a small-time journalist who is equally interested in the case, helps him unfold many mysteries. He finds out that the dead family's head is Suresh, the boss of an archaeology department. He worked with Sampath to uncover jewels from the Vijayanagara Empire, and was the same day, Sampath was mysteriously killed. 

On the same day, Suresh was found with a bloodstained shirt, so Shyam realized that Suresh killed Sampath. The arrival of Mutthanna, a retired cop, who investigated the case decades ago, and actress Madhuri into the plot, makes things complex for Shyam. Kumar tells Shyam that Madhuri is related to the case, so Shakthi goes to ask her questions. But, it proves unsuccessful. Mutthanna decides to help Shyam by giving him information from what he investigated. He reveals that Suresh actually didn't kill Sampath and that the blood on Suresh's shirt was from a wounded person whom Suresh had saved. Who killed Sampath, and how the family died still remains a mystery. Madhuri was also killed later. When Mutthanna and Shakthi went to investigate her house, they see a picture of Madhuri wearing a necklace from the Vijayanagara Empire excavation. 

They see a goon who breaks into the house. Shyam and Mutthanna chase after him. When they follow the goon, it leads them to a resort. In a park near the resort, Mutthanna recognizes a place where the car was originally burnt. Inside the resort, a political leader is giving a speech, and Shyam gets a call from Kumar to meet him. Kumar tells him that before Madhuri was an actress, she used to be a dancer who danced for gangsters. One person had a deep connection with Madhuri, who was Mailur Srinivas Rao, the upcoming CM of Karnataka. Meanwhile, Mutthanna discovers that the resort belongs to Mailur. Shakthi goes to inspect Mailur's old home to find more evidence. He finds holy Christian objects hidden in a high shelf. This confuses Shyam because Mailur is a Hindu. He tells Mutthanna, who goes to Mailur's campaign. He notices that Mailur looks like Fernandez, Suresh's old driver. 

In front of the crowd, he shouts "Fernandez" to which Mailur looks awkwardly at Mutthanna. He gets scared and tells his goons to abduct him. Mutthanna tells Shyam everything, and then he is taken. Mailur explains to Mutthanna that he found out that Suresh was holding a treasure worth 80 lakhs in his department, so he kills Sampath. And, just to make sure he gets away with the money, he plans to kill Suresh too. He tells Bablu about his plan, but he doesn't tell him about Sampath. He tells Bablu to put sleeping pills in the family's food, so they can make a run. But, what Bablu doesn't know that the pills are poisoned. The whole family dies, and Bablu threatens to tell the police about what Fernandez did. However, the bag containing the pills had Bablu's fingerprints, so he would also get in trouble. 

Fernandez takes their dead bodies in his car, buries them, and burns the car. He takes the jewelry and becomes rich. To make sure no one got suspicious, he changed his identity into Mailur Srinivas Rao. After that, Mailur has his goons kill Mutthanna. Shyam arrives and is too late to save Mutthanna, who soon dies. Before he dies, Mutthanna tells Shyam what Mailur did. He gets mad and kills Mailur's goons. He eventually finds out that Kumar is actually Bablu. He goes to inquire this to Kumar, but Kumar's daughter arrives, forcing Shyam to leave. After this, he goes to Mailur to threaten him, but he actually goes there to work for Mailur, who tells him to kill Bablu/Kumar. On a car ride, he stops his car and shoots Kumar, but not before recording him telling everything about Mailur and Madhuri. 

Kumar reveals that when he went to interview Madhuri, he accidentally knocks her to the floor and kills her. After killing Kumar, Shyam goes to Mailur's swearing ceremony and tells him that he killed Kumar. But, it turns out that Shyam lied, and that he didn't kill Kumar. Kumar disguises himself and serves milk to Mailur, which is actually poisoned and Mailur dies on the spot. When Shyam and Kumar drive in the car, Kumar reveals that he drank the remaining poison because he felt guilty. The recording Kumar made becomes viral and everyone learns about Mailur and his past sins. Because of his work on this case, Shyam gets promoted as Inspector in the crime branch. It is revealed that the man who Suresh saved all those years ago was actually Shyam's dad which made him take interest in this case.

Cast 

 Rishi as K. S. Shyam, Sub Inspector, Bangalore City Traffic Police
 Anant Nag as Muthanna, a retired police inspector
 Achyuth Kumar as Kumar, Editor of Lockup News/Bablu
 Suman Ranganathan as Madhuri, actress
 Roshni Prakash as Priya, the daughter of Kumar
 Avinash as Laxman, Editor in Chief of TV7
 Sulile Kumar as Lokesh 
 Sampath Maitreya as Mailuru Srinivasa Rao/Fernandes
 Sidhaartha Maadhyamika as Mr. Gurudas Naidu
 Samanvitha Shetty as Mrs. Vijayalakshmi Naidu
 Bharath Gowda as Bablu/Young age Kumar
 Siri Ravikumar as Geetha Muttanna
 Sharmila S. Karthik as Thimmakka
 Kiran Kumar as Sebastian
 Hanumanthegowda as K. Ganapathy
 Ramesh Pandit as Chalapathy

Soundtrack 

The music is composed by Charan Raj.

Songs

Original Motion Picture Soundtrack

The background score of the film was appreciated by both audiences and critics alike. Following that, the original soundtrack was released on 9 May 2019 in YouTube and all other platforms.

Awards and nominations

References

External links 

2019 films
Indian thriller films
2010s Kannada-language films
2019 thriller films
Kannada films remade in other languages